The single Even If was released by Christian pop trio ZOEgirl to radio stations on September 27, 2002.  It reached number 8 on the R&R Christian CHR National Airplay chart.

Track list
Even If
Even If (Prefab Mix)
Anything Is Possible

Versions

Smash-up
The song "Even If" was also released as a mash-up on the Smash-Ups CD, as the tenth and last track.  The music from "Even If" is combined with the vocals from Carman's "Who's In The House",  transforming the rap into a modern upbeat dance track. Christian Music Today criticized the new creation, and encourages listeners to "...end the listening experience with track 9..." or even "...intentionally scratch out the track with a pen-knife."

Charts
On November 29, 2002, the song peaked at #8 on the R&R Christian CHR National Airplay chart.

In popular media
The song "Even If" was featured on WWE Tough Enough.

References

External links
 Even If single on CD and LP

2002 singles
2002 songs
Sparrow Records singles
Songs written by Tedd T